Thabo September (born 3 November 1982) is a retired South African football defender who played for SuperSport United. He studied towards a degree in sports management at the PE Technikon campus in George.

References

1982 births
South African soccer players
Living people
SuperSport United F.C. players
Bush Bucks F.C. players
Association football defenders
People from Knysna
Soccer players from the Western Cape